Rigmor Aarø Spiten (born 29 March 1943) is a Norwegian politician for the Centre Party.

She served as a deputy representative to the Parliament of Norway for the constituency Oppland during the term 1985–1989. In total she met during 43 days of parliamentary session.

References

1943 births
Living people
Oppland politicians
Deputy members of the Storting
Centre Party (Norway) politicians
Women members of the Storting
Place of birth missing (living people)
20th-century Norwegian women politicians
20th-century Norwegian politicians